Kevin Leon Byard Jr. (born August 17, 1993) is an American football free safety for the Tennessee Titans of the National Football League (NFL). He played college football at Middle Tennessee. Byard was drafted by the Titans in the third round of the 2016 NFL Draft. In 2017, his second season in the NFL, he was selected to the Pro Bowl and the First-team All-Pro and was the co-leader for most interceptions throughout the season. Additionally, he led the NFL in takeaways with 10 (8 interceptions and 2 fumble recoveries).

Early life
Byard was born on August 17, 1993, in Philadelphia, Pennsylvania. After his parents divorced at the age of 14, Byard moved to Atlanta, Georgia with his mother and siblings. He attended Martin Luther King, Jr. High School in Lithonia, Georgia. In high school, he participated in football and track.

College career
Byard played for the Middle Tennessee State Blue Raiders of Middle Tennessee State University from 2012 to 2015. He was redshirted in 2011. He earned Honorable Mention All-Conference USA honors in 2013. He was named First-team All-Conference USA in 2014 and 2015. Byard's 19 career interceptions are the most in school history. Byard graduated from Middle Tennessee in May 2015 with a degree in liberal studies.

Collegiate statistics

Professional career
On November 22, 2015, Byard announced on Twitter that he had accepted his invitation to play in the 2016 Senior Bowl. He was impressive during the week of practices leading up to the Senior Bowl, as he displayed his ball-hawking and athletic ability. Byard met with representatives from the Atlanta Falcons during the week. Byard was not one of the 60 defensive backs invited to the NFL combine. On March 31, 2016, he participated at Middle Tennessee's pro day, along with 18 other teammates. He surprised many scouts and analysts with a 4.46 and 4.50 in the 40-yard dash as many scouting reports listed speed as one of his weaknesses. Team representatives and scouts from 24 NFL teams were in attendance with Byard as the top prospect performing. He met with representatives from the Oakland Raiders, Detroit Lions, and Tennessee Titans during his pro day. Byard had official private visits or workouts with 12 teams that included the Miami Dolphins, Green Bay Packers, Cleveland Browns, Titans, and Los Angeles Rams. At the conclusion of the pre-draft process, Byard received many mixed draft projections from draft experts and scouts, with some (NFLDraftScout.com) projecting him to be a third or fourth round pick to others (NFL.com) projecting him to be drafted in the sixth or seventh round. He was ranked the fifth best strong safety prospect in the draft by NFLDraftScout.com.

2016 season
Byard was drafted by the Tennessee Titans with the first pick in the third round (64th overall) in the 2016 NFL Draft. Byard was the 24th player ever drafted from Middle Tennessee State and the highest player drafted from there since Tyrone Calico (second round, 60th overall), who was also selected by the Titans, in the 2003 NFL Draft. Byard was the fifth safety selected in the 2016 NFL draft.

On July 18, 2016, the Tennessee Titans signed Byard to a four-year, $3.63 million contract with a signing bonus of $897,060.

Throughout training camp, he competed with Rashad Johnson for the vacant starting free safety position left by the release of Michael Griffin. Head coach Mike Mularkey named Johnson the starting free safety to start the regular season with Byard serving as his backup.

Byard made his NFL debut in the Titans' season-opener against the Minnesota Vikings and collected five solo tackles in a 25–16 loss. On November 6, he recorded a season-high ten combined tackles in the Titans' 43–35 loss at the San Diego Chargers. His playing time increased after Johnson missed Weeks 8–9 after suffering a neck injury. On November 13,  Byard received his first career start and recorded seven solo tackles and made his first NFL sack on Green Bay Packers' quarterback Aaron Rodgers during a 47–25 victory. Although Johnson returned from injury in Week 10, Byard remained the starting free safety for the last seven games of the season. He finished his rookie season with a total of 58 combined tackles (44 solo), one sack, and four pass deflections in seven starts and 16 games. He also finished second on the squad with 10 special teams tackles.

2017 season
Byard entered training camp slated as the Titans' de facto free safety after they opted not to re-sign Rashad Johnson. As expected, he was named the starting free safety to begin the  season.

Byard started the Titans' season-opener against the Oakland Raiders and recorded eight solo tackles in a 26–16 loss. On October 1, 2017, he collected a season-high nine combined tackles and made his first career interception off of Deshaun Watson, as the Titans lost 57–14 to the Houston Texans. On October 22, 2017, Byard recorded four combined tackles, three pass deflections, and had two interceptions off of Cleveland Browns' quarterback DeShone Kizer and one interception off of Cody Kessler during the Titans' 12–9 overtime win in Week 7. His three-interception performance earned him AFC Defensive Player of the Week. The following week, Byard made four solo tackles, defended three passes, and intercepted Baltimore Ravens' quarterback Joe Flacco twice to help his team earn a 23–20 victory. He became the fifth player in NFL history to record five interceptions in a two-game span joining DeAngelo Hall (2010), Albert Lewis (1985), Willie Buchanon (1978), and Mike Haynes (1976). Byard received a grade of 89.9 from Pro Football Focus which was the third highest grade among safeties through the first twelve games, only behind Harrison Smith (94.2) and Adrian Amos (92.3). In Week 13, he made a season-high nine combined tackles and deflected a pass during a 24–13 victory against the Houston Texans. On December 31, 2017, Byard recorded six combined tackles, broke up two passes, and intercepted two passes by Blake Bortles in the Titans' 15–10 victory over the Jacksonville Jaguars. His performance earned him AFC Defensive Player of the Week. He finished the  season with 87 combined tackles (62 solo), 16 pass deflections, and eight interceptions in 16 games and 16 starts. His eight interceptions led the league and he was named first-team All-Pro.

The Titans finished second in the AFC South with a 9–7 record and received a playoff berth. On January 6, 2018, Byard started in his first NFL playoff game and recorded five solo tackles during a 22–21 win at the Kansas City Chiefs in the AFC Wild Card Round. The following week, Byard made ten combined tackles (nine solo) in the Titans' 35–14 loss at the New England Patriots in the AFC Divisional Round. On January 21, 2018, Byard was selected to appear in the 2018 Pro Bowl as an injury replacement. It marked his first career Pro Bowl. He was also ranked 80th by his fellow players on the NFL Top 100 Players of 2018.

2018 season
During Week 2, Byard threw a touchdown to rookie Dane Cruikshank on a fake punt in a 20–17 victory over the Houston Texans. In a Week 6 21–0 loss to the Baltimore Ravens, Byard logged his first interception of the season by picking off Joe Flacco.
In a 28–14 Week 9 road victory over the Dallas Cowboys, Byard intercepted quarterback Dak Prescott in the end zone. After the pick, Byard celebrated on the star at midfield. The celebration was widely publicized as it resembled Terrell Owens' infamous celebration from the early 2000s. Byard was fined $10,026 for the celebration. During Week 15 in a 17–0 shutout road win over the New York Giants, Byard had five tackles, an interception, and a sack. He also deflected a fourth down pass from Eli Manning to complete a shutout against the Giants. On December 22, 2018, in a 25–16 Week 16 victory over the Washington Redskins, Byard made an important late-game interception by picking off Josh Johnson. The Titans missed the playoffs by losing 33–17 in Week 17 against the Indianapolis Colts and finishing with a 9–7 record. Byard completed the 2018 season with 90 tackles, two sacks, eight pass deflections, and four interceptions.

2019 season

On July 24, 2019, Byard signed a five-year extension worth $70.5 million with $31 million guaranteed with the Titans, making him the highest-paid safety in NFL history.

During the season-opener against the Cleveland Browns, Byard made an interception off Baker Mayfield and returned it 28 yards in the Titans' 43–13 road victory. In Week 5 against the Buffalo Bills, Byard intercepted Josh Allen once in the 14–7 loss. In the next against the Denver Broncos, he recorded an interception off Joe Flacco that bounced off tight end Noah Fant's back in the 16–0 road loss. In the next game against the Los Angeles Chargers, he caught an 11-yard reception from punter Brett Kern on a fake punt in the 23–20 victory. In the regular-season finale against the Houston Texans, Byard intercepted a pass thrown by A. J. McCarron during the 35–14 road victory. He finished the 2019 season with 84 total tackles, five interceptions, and nine passes defended.

In the Divisional Round of the playoffs against the Baltimore Ravens, Byard intercepted an early pass from Lamar Jackson to help set the tone for the 28–12 victory.

2020 season
In Week 1 against the Denver Broncos on Monday Night Football, Byard recorded a team high 9 tackles and forced a fumble on running back Melvin Gordon during the 16–14 win.
In Week 15 against the Detroit Lions, Byard recorded his first interception of the season of a pass thrown by Chase Daniel during the 46–25 win. He finished the 2020 season with 111 total tackles (79 solo), one interceptions, seven passes defended, and one forced fumble in 16 games and starts. Byard's 111 total tackles led the team.

2021 season
In Week 5, against the Jacksonville Jaguars, Byard recorded 30-yard in fumble return for a touchdown in the 37–19 victory.  Byard was named AFC Defensive Player of the Month for October. In Week 9, against the Los Angeles Rams, he had a 24-yard interception returned for a touchdown in the 28–16 victory. In the 2021 season, he finished with 88 total tackles, five interceptions, 13 passes defended, and two forced fumbles in 17 games and starts. He was named to the Pro Bowl and earned first team All-Pro honors. He was ranked 34th by his fellow players on the NFL Top 100 Players of 2022.

2022 season
In Week 17 against the Dallas Cowboys, Byard had two interceptions in the 27–13 loss. Byard started all 17 games in the 2022 season. He finished with 108 total tackles (69 solo), four interceptions, and six passes defended. He led the team in total tackles and interceptions.

NFL career statistics

Regular season

Postseason

NFL records
 Longest touchdown pass by a defensive player in the Super Bowl era (66 yards)

Titans franchise records
 First player in team history to record five interceptions in a two-game span

Personal life
Byard married his girlfriend, Clarke Conner, in 2018. They had their first child, a daughter, Eliana Rose, on August 22, 2019. Byard is a Christian.

Byard is also called the “Mayor of Murfreesboro” as a nickname referencing his college town.

References

External links

 
 Middle Tennessee Blue Raiders bio
Tennessee Titans bio

1993 births
Living people
Players of American football from Georgia (U.S. state)
People from Lithonia, Georgia
American football safeties
Middle Tennessee Blue Raiders football players
Tennessee Titans players
Sportspeople from DeKalb County, Georgia
American Conference Pro Bowl players